Bart Vriends (born 9 May 1991, in Amersfoort) is a Dutch professional footballer who plays as a centre back for Sparta Rotterdam in the Eredivisie. He formerly played for FC Utrecht and Go Ahead Eagles.

Style of play 
Vriends is known as strong at ball interception and blocking the ball, but he is weak at passing.

References

External links
 
 Career stats & Profile - Voetbal International

1991 births
Living people
Sportspeople from Amersfoort
Association football central defenders
Dutch footballers
FC Utrecht players
Go Ahead Eagles players
Sparta Rotterdam players
Eredivisie players
Eerste Divisie players
Tweede Divisie players
Footballers from Utrecht (province)